The Chasm is a death metal band originally from Mexico City, and currently residing in Chicago. They have been described as one of Mexico's most respected metal bands. The band was formed by singer/guitarist/bassist Daniel Corchado in 1992, after he left another early Mexican metal band, Cenotaph. Corchado and drummer Antonio Leon have been the band's only constant members.

Their first album was released in 1994, and while they remained an underground act in many countries, they found popularity in Latin America and Europe, and reached further audiences after signing with the UK-based Earache Records. They are primarily known for death metal, but they are also influenced by other metal genres including thrash metal, black metal, progressive metal, and doom metal.

Discography

 Procreation of the Inner Temple (1994)
 From The Lost Years (1995)
 Deathcult For Eternity: The Triumph (1998)
 Procession To The Infraworld (2000)
 Reaching The Veil of Death (EP) (2001)
 Conjuration of the Spectral Empire (2002)
 The Spell of Retribution (2004)
 Farseeing the Paranormal Abysm (2009)
 A Conscious Creation from the Isolated Domain-Phase I (2017)
 The Scars of a Lost Reflective Shadow (2022)

Band members

Current members 
 Daniel Corchado - vocals, guitar, bass (1992 - )
 Antonio Leon - drums (1992 - )

Session members 
 George Velaetis - bass (2003, 2005, 2006)
 Roberto Lizarraga (2005)

Former members
 Erick Diaz-Soto - guitar (1992–1993, 1994–1997)
 Luis Martinez - bass (1992–1994)
 Luis Antonio Ramos - guitar (1993–1994)
 Rodolfo Riveron - bass (1994)
 Roberto Valle - bass (1999)
 Alfonso Polo - bass (2000–2003)
 Julio Viterbo (1998-2013)

Timeline

References

External links 
[ Allmusic] biography
Official site
Record Label

Mexican death metal musical groups
Musical groups from Chicago
Musical groups established in 1992
Earache Records artists